The 2016–17 Kosovo Basketball SuperLeague was the 23rd season of the Kosovo Basketball Superleague. The season started on October 8, 2016, and ended on May 24, 2017. Sigal Prishtina won its thirteenth title.

Teams

KB Rahoveci has been promoted to the league after winning 2015–16 Kosovo Basketball First League. KB Kastrioti who finished in last place during the 2015-2016 season, relegated from the Super League

Venues and locations

Notes

 Promoted from the 2015–16 Kosovo Basketball First League.
 Teams that play in the 2016–17 FIBA Europe Cup

Regular season

Playoffs
The semi-finals and finals were played in a best-of-five playoff format. The higher seeded teams played game one, three and five (if necessary) at home.

Play-out
Kerasan Prishtina defeated Drita in the relegation playoffs.

References

External links
Official website of Kosovo Basketball Superleague

Kosovo Basketball Superleague seasons
Kosovo
Basketball